John Lloyd Barke (16 December 1916 – 1976) was an English professional footballer who played in the Football League for Mansfield Town and Sheffield United.

References

1916 births
1976 deaths
English footballers
Association football defenders
English Football League players
Chesterfield F.C. players
Scunthorpe United F.C. players
Sheffield United F.C. players
Mansfield Town F.C. players
Denaby United F.C. players
Heanor Town F.C. players
Ilkeston Town F.C. (1945) players
Belper Town F.C. players
Mansfield Town F.C. managers
English football managers